The 1960 Arizona State–Flagstaff Lumberjacks football team was an American football team that represented Arizona State College at Flagstaff (now known as Northern Arizona University) in the Frontier Conference during the 1960 NAIA football season. In their fifth year under head coach Max Spilsbury, the Lumberjacks compiled a 6–3–2 record (2–0–1 against conference opponents), tied for the Frontier Conference championship, and outscored opponents by a total of 260 to 176.

The team played its home games at Lumberjack Stadium in Flagstaff, Arizona.

Schedule

References

Arizona State-Flagstaff
Northern Arizona Lumberjacks football seasons
Arizona State-Flagstaff Lumberjacks football